The 2019 FIM Moto2 World Championship was a part of the 71st F.I.M. Road Racing World Championship season. Francesco Bagnaia was the reigning series champion but he was unable to defend his title as he joined the series' premier class, the MotoGP. 

The season saw the introduction of a new engine package. The Honda CBR600RR inline-4 engine package, which was used since the inaugural season of Moto2 in 2010, was replaced by a  inline-3 engine manufacturered by Triumph Motorcycles. It is based on the engine of the Triumph Street Triple RS 765. Due to availability constraints on the new Moto2 2019 engine, and the fact that there will be no machines of this specification in other championships, teams agreed to halt Moto2 wildcard entries for 2019.

This class and Moto3 also adopted the qualifying format used by MotoGP for the season, in which the riders that placed 15th or lower on combined times in the third free practice session would be admitted to qualifying 1, then the four fastest riders from that session would join the fastest 14 riders in qualifying 2.

Álex Márquez became the Moto2 champion of 2019 seeing for the second time both Marquez brothers claiming championships in the same year in their respective classes with Marc Marquez winning his 6th Premier class title. Despite finishing the final race in Valencia outside the points area, Marquez secured his title with over ten podium finishes with five of them in 1st place securing his championship ahead of Brad Binder by three points.

Teams and riders

All the bikes used series-specified Dunlop tyres and Triumph 765cc 3-cylinder engines.

Team changes
 Tech3 switched manufacturers to KTM in line with their switch to KTM bikes in the MotoGP class, after having previously competed in Moto2 with their own chassis.
 MV Agusta returned to Grand Prix motorcycle racing after being absent for 42 years, joining forces with Forward Racing to compete in Moto2. This results in Suter's withdrawal from Moto2.
 Tasca Racing Scuderia Moto2 downsized to one bike again after having previously competed with two bikes in the 2018 season.
 Marinelli Snipers Team withdrew from Moto2.
Ángel Nieto Team expanded its operations to field two bikes in Moto2.

Rider changes
 Jorge Martín moved up to Moto2 with Red Bull KTM Ajo, filling the spot vacated by Miguel Oliveira who moved up to MotoGP with KTM Tech3.
 Joan Mir moved up to MotoGP to join Team Suzuki Ecstar as a teammate to Álex Rins in 2019.
 Marco Bezzecchi and Philipp Öttl moved up to Moto2 with Red Bull KTM Tech3, replacing Bo Bendsneyder and Remy Gardner, who moved to NTS RW Racing GP and SAG Team respectively.
 Thomas Lüthi returned to Moto2 with Dynavolt Intact GP after one season in MotoGP, replacing Xavi Vierge, who moved to EG 0,0 Marc VDS.
 Sam Lowes left Swiss Innovative Investors team to return to Gresini Racing. Lowes previously competed with Gresini Racing in the 2016 Moto2 & 2017 MotoGP seasons. His seat was taken by Joe Roberts.
 Jorge Navarro moved to Speed Up Racing, replacing Danny Kent.
 Romano Fenati, who was on the provisional entry list, withdrew from the 2019 season after his contract with MV Agusta Reparto Corse Forward Racing Team was terminated due to the controversial incident at the 2018 San Marino Grand Prix. He returned to Moto3 with the Marinelli Snipers team.
 Nicolò Bulega moved up to Moto2 with Sky Racing Team VR46, filling the spot vacated by Francesco Bagnaia who moved up to MotoGP with Pramac Racing.
 Fabio Di Giannantonio moved up to Moto2 with Speed Up Racing, replacing Fabio Quartararo who moved up to MotoGP.
 Enea Bastianini moved up to Moto2 with Italtrans Racing Team, replacing Mattia Pasini.
 Khairul Idham Pawi moved to Petronas Sprinta Racing, replacing Niki Tuuli, who moved to the MotoE World Cup.
 Jake Dixon will make his full season debut with Ángel Nieto Team. He was partnered with Xavi Cardelús, who made his full season debut in Moto2 after he previously made some Moto2 appearances in the 2018 season as a wildcard & replacement rider.
 IDEMITSU Honda Team Asia will field two new riders for the 2019 season: Dimas Ekky Pratama and Somkiat Chantra, who moved up from CEV Moto2 and CEV Moto3 respectively.
 Tetsuta Nagashima returned to SAG Team, replacing Jules Danilo, who moved to the Supersport World Championship.
 Dominique Aegerter switched team from Kiefer Racing to Forward Racing. His place was taken by Lukas Tulovic, who previously filled in for him for a few races in 2018.
 Isaac Viñales left Moto2 for the Supersport World Championship.

In-season changes
 Augusto Fernández was forced to miss the Austin round following a crash in the previous race. His place was filled by Mattia Pasini.
 Somkiat Chantra missed the Italian and German Grands Prix due to injury. He was replaced by Teppei Nagoe in Mugello.
 Philipp Öttl missed the German GP due to injuries sustained in a crash at Assen.
 Simone Corsi was dropped by Tasca Racing due to poor results and replaced by Mattia Pasini from the Czech GP onwards.
 Steven Odendaal was dropped from NTS RW Racing GP after the British GP. Simone Corsi was his replacement for the San Marino and Aragon GP, who was then replaced by Jesko Raffin from the Thailand GP onwards. Raffin also filled in for Odendaal in the first three races of the season, due to injury.
 Khairul Idham Pawi suffered a Grade 3 open fracture of his little finger in a crash during Friday practice at the 2019 Spanish motorcycle Grand Prix. He returned at the 2019 Czech Republic motorcycle Grand Prix, but withdrew after the Friday practice sessions due to injury and missed the rest of the season. During his absence, he was replaced by several riders:
Mattia Pasini (French and Italian GP)
Jonas Folger (Catalan, Dutch TT, German, Czech and Austrian GP)
Bradley Smith (British GP)
Adam Norrodin (San Marino, Aragon, Thai, Japanese, Australian, Malaysian and Valencian GP)

Calendar
The following Grands Prix took place during the season:

 ‡ = Night race

Results and standings

Grands Prix

Riders' standings
Scoring system
Points were awarded to the top fifteen finishers. A rider had to finish the race to earn points.

Constructors' standings
Scoring system
Points were awarded to the top fifteen finishers. A rider had to finish the race to earn points.

 Each constructor got the same number of points as their best placed rider in each race.

Teams' standings
The teams' standings were based on results obtained by regular and substitute riders; wild-card entries were ineligible.

Notes

References

Moto2
Grand Prix motorcycle racing seasons